Nama is a genus of herbaceous plants belonging to the family Boraginaceae. Most are found in North America. Many are known by the common name fiddleleaf.

Selected species

Formerly placed here
Evolvulus convolvuloides (Willd.) Stearn (as N. convolvuloides Willd.)
Eriodictyon parryi (A.Gray) Greene (as N. parryi A.Gray)

Gallery

References

External links

 
Boraginaceae genera